Claire Castillon, born May 25, 1975 in Boulogne-Billancourt (France), is a French writer. She writes novels, short stories and children's books.

Life

In 2000, she publishes her first novel, Le Grenier, edited by Anne Carrière, which does not go unnoticed. When asked about the genuine violence of her style, she answers: This is crude and painful, not crude and gratuitous. This is not about talking bodies just for the sake of it. This is sort of outburst in pain.

Her play La poupée qui tousse is performed at the Théâtre de l'Opprimé in Paris, in 2003.

In 2004, she receives the Grand Prix Thyde Monnier from the SGDL for her novel Vous parler d'elle (Fayard 2004).

In the mid-2000s, she works with the movie director Marion Vernoux on an adaptation of her novel Je prends Racine, adaptation which is not produced.

Her collection of short stories Les Bulles (Fayard, 2010) is brought to light by the same Marion Vernoux and performed at the Marigny theater in Paris in 2013.

In 2015, her novel Eux (l'Olivier, 2014) receives Marie-Claire feminine novel award.

She animates writing workshops within the FIT association (a woman - a roof), and writes a testimony dedicated to the women she met through the association, bringing to light their daily suffering. 

She regularly writes chronicles of a young mother in the magazine Parents .

Her collection of short stories Insecte(Fayard 2006) is translated into 25 languages. My mother never dies is the translation made by Harcourt in the US. In 2016, the movie director Elsa Blayau adapts it into a short film. 

Her collection of short stories Rebelles, un peu, receives in May 2018 the Prix L'Échappée littéraire, which jury is composed of high school students from the French region Bourgogne-Franche-Comté .

Works

Novels
 Le Grenier, Anne Carrière, 2000. , awarded the Prix Contrepoint
 Je prends racine, Anne Carrière, 2001. 
 La Reine Claude, Stock, 2002. 
 Pourquoi tu m'aimes pas ?, Fayard, 2003. 
 Vous parler d'elle, Fayard, 2004. 
 Dessous, c'est l'enfer, Fayard, 2008. 
 Les Cris, Fayard, 2010. 
 Les Merveilles, Grasset, 2012. 
 Les couplets: Nouvelles, Grasset, 2013. 
 Eux, novel, L’Olivier, 2014. 
 Les Pêchers. Paris : L’Olivier, 09/2015, 202 p. ; Points n° 4683, 11/2017, 160 p. 
 Ma grande. Paris : Gallimard, coll. "La Blanche", 04/2018, 145 p. ; Gallimard, coll. "Folio" n° 6749, 01/2020, 172 p. 
 Marche blanche. Paris : Gallimard, coll. "La Blanche", 01/2020, 166 p.

Short stories
 Insecte. Paris : Fayard, 01/2006, 160 p. ; France loisirs, coll. "Piment", 2006, 134 p.  ; Le Livre de poche n° 30757, 03/2007, 150 p.  ; Points n° 4284, 05/2016, 133 p. 
 On n'empêche pas un petit cœur d'aimer. Paris : Fayard, 01/2007, 156 p. ; le Grand livre du mois, 2006, 156 p.  ; Le Livre de poche n° 31082, 09/2008, 148 p.  ; Points n° 4695, 11/2017, 126 p. 
 Les Bulles (recueil de 38 nouvelles). Paris : Fayard, 2010, 191 p. ; Le Livre de poche n° 32494, 03/2011, 160 p. 
 Le Mâle en moi, supplément au n° 720 de Marie Claire, coll. « Les nouvelles érotiques de l’été » n° 2 : La Volupté, août 2012.
 Les Moitiés, supplément de la revue Vogue n° 929, août 2012, 62 p.
 Les Couplets. Paris : Grasset, 04/2013, 202 p. ; Le Livre de poche n° 33810, 07/2015, 208 p. 
 Les Messieurs. Paris : L'Olivier, 05/2016, 163 p. ; Points n° 4588, 05/2017, 130 p. 
 Rebelles, un peu. Paris : L'Olivier, 05/2017, 201 p. ; Points n° 4797, 05/2018, 176 p. .

in English
 My Mother Never Dies: Stories, Houghton, 2009

Collections
 48 h au Lutetia : 8 auteurs écrivent sur le thème du sommeil. Paris : Scali, 06/2005, 153 p. 
 Écrire au réveil, dans Le Petit Livre des plaisirs : 50 façons de goûter la vie / par Christophe André et 25 auteurs ; photographies de Sandrine Expilly. Paris : Psychologies, sd, p. 63.

Children's novels 
 Tous les matins depuis hier. Paris : École des loisirs, coll. "Neuf", 03/2013, 179 p. 
 Un maillot de bain une pièce avec des pastèques et des ananas. Paris : École des loisirs, coll. "Neuf", 02/2014, 179 p. 
 Tu es mignon parce que tu es un peu nul. Paris : École des loisirs, coll. "Neuf", 10/2014, 190 p. 
 Cucu. Paris : École des loisirs, coll. "Neuf", 04/2015, 178 p. 
 Y a-t-il quelqu'un dans Casimir ?. Paris : École des loisirs, coll. "Neuf", 04/2016, 152 p. 
 Les Piqûres d'Abeille. Paris : Flammarion jeunesse, 04/2017, 150 p. 
 Proxima du Centaure. Paris : Flammarion jeunesse, 02/2018, 222 p. 
 Miss Crampon. Paris : Flammarion jeunesse, 01/2019, 202 p. 
 River. Paris : Gallimard jeunesse, coll. "Scripto", 09/2019, 184 p.

References

People from Boulogne-Billancourt
1975 births
Living people
French women novelists
21st-century French novelists
21st-century French women writers